Grotton and Springhead railway station served the villages of Grotton and Springhead from 1856 until 1955.

History
Grotton was one of two intermediate stations which opened on the same day.

On 1 April 1900, the station was renamed Grotton and Springhead.

The station closed on 2 May 1955, when the Delph Donkey passenger train service to  via Greenfield was withdrawn. The line remained in use for goods traffic until 1964. The station building still survives as a private residence.

References

An Illustrated History of Oldham's Railways by John Hooper

External links
Grotton and Springhead Station on navigable 1948 O.S. map

Disused railway stations in the Metropolitan Borough of Oldham
Former London and North Western Railway stations
Railway stations in Great Britain opened in 1856
Railway stations in Great Britain closed in 1955